The Two Sentences is a 1915 American silent short drama film directed by Tom Ricketts starring Harry Van Meter, Perry Banks, Jack Richardson, Louise Lester, Vivian Rich, and David Lythgoe.

Cast
 Harry Van Meter as Jim Rodgers
 Perry Banks as Jeff Wade
 Louise Lester as Mrs. Jeff Wade
 Vivian Rich as Helen Wade - Daughter
 Reaves Eason as William Ford
 Jack Richardson as Fred Clark
 Charlotte Burton as Nellie Carter
 David Lythgoe as Tom Carter

External links

1915 films
1915 drama films
Silent American drama films
American silent short films
American black-and-white films
1915 short films
Films directed by Tom Ricketts
1910s American films